Charles Walter Sneyd-Kynnersley  (1849 - 11 July 1904) (also known as C W Sneyd-Kynnersley or C W S Kynnersley), was a British colonial administrator. He joined the Straits Settlements Civil Service in 1872 and was the acting Colonial Secretary of Straits Settlements.

Career
Charles joined the Straits Settlements Civil Service in 1872.

In 1877, he was appointed Superintendent of Prisons in Penang.

In 1881, he was appointed the First Magistrate of Penang and as First Magistrate of Singapore in 1890.

In 1895, he was appointed as the Resident Councillor of Malacca.

In 1897, he was appointment as the Resident Councillor of Penang was made permanent after A M Skinner retired.

In 1899, he was the acting colonial secretary serving alongside Sir Walter Egerton, after the sudden death of Sir Charles Mitchell (Governor of Straits Settlements), with James Alexander Swettenham (Colonial Secretary) being appointed the Acting Governor.

Kynnersley Report
In January 1902, Charles was appointed by the Legislative Council to setup a commission to study and report on the system of English education in the Straits Settlements, especially pertaining to secondary and technical education and was presented to the Legislative Council on 6 June 1902. The resultant report was known as Report of the Commission of Enquiry into the System of English Education in the Colony.

Personal life
Charles Walter Sneyd-Kynnersley was born in 1849 and was the son of Thomas Clement Sneyd-Kynnersley, of Moor Green, Worcestershire and was educated at Rugby, Warwickshire.

He married Ada Maud, daughter of Rev. George Nash, Prebendary of Salisbury in 1884.

He died from heart failure on 11 July 1904 at Wimbledon, London.

After his death, Ada Maud remarried with Sir Walter Egerton.

Honour
Charles was invested with Companion of the Most Distinguished Order of St. Michael and St. George (CMG) in 1899 New Year Honours.

References

1849 births
1904 deaths
Administrators in British Singapore
Chief Secretaries of Singapore
Companions of the Order of St Michael and St George